Carlos Flores Vizcarra (born July 22, 1952) is a Mexican politician and former diplomat.

Flores Vizcarra grew up in Mazatlan, Sinaloa and studied at the National Autonomous University of Mexico. Vizcarra received his master's degree in Economics from the University of Paris III.

Flores Vizcarra served as Federal Deputy during the LVI Legislature of the Mexican Congress, representing The Federal District.

In the Secretariat of Foreign Affairs, Flores Vizcarra served as:

 Consul of Mexico in Tucson, Arizona.
 Consul General of Mexico in Phoenix, Arizona. 
 Consul General of Mexico in North Carolina and South Carolina. 
 Consul of Mexico in Calexico, California.

References

1952 births
Living people
National Autonomous University of Mexico alumni
University of Paris alumni
Members of the Chamber of Deputies (Mexico) for Mexico City
Mexican diplomats
Mexican expatriates in France
Mexican expatriates in the United States
20th-century Mexican politicians